Strategic Grid Model is a contingency approach that can be used to determine the strategic relevance of IT to the organization. The model was proposed by F. Warren McFarlan and James L. McKenney in 1983, the model takes the impact of the information technology on the strategy in the future planning as the horizontal axis, and the current impact of the information technology on the corporate strategy as the vertical axis, which is divided into four types: Support, Turnaround, Factory, and Strategic.

Overview
Strategic Grid Model has four quadrants built around two straightforward questions:
How important does management feel the current IT systems are to the company?
How important does the company think future developments in IT will be for the company, ie the impact of future IT developments on its way of doing business?
Depending on the responses to these questions, a company can be placed in the four quadrants as follows:

Analysis
In order to assess the strategic impact of IT, McFarlan proposed the analysis of five basic questions about IT applications, related to the competitive forces:
Can IT applications build barriers to the entry of new competitors in the industry?
Can IT applications build switching costs for suppliers?
Can IT applications change the basis of competition?
Can IT applications change the balance of power in supplier relationships?
Can IT applications create new products?
Nevertheless, these questions should take into account current and future planned circumstances. Thus, IT may present a smaller or greater importance, according to the kind of company and industry operations.

References

Strategic management
Business planning